Loltun Cave is a cave in the Yucatán, approximately  south of Oxkutzcab.  The cave contains paintings attributed to the Maya civilization from the Late Preclassic Era or even older.  The name is Mayan for "Flower Stone" ("Lol-Tun").

History 
This cave is about two kilometers in length.
Inside Loltún there is evidence that confirms human occupation such as recovered bones of mammoth, bison, cats, and deer remains from the pleistocene.
On the walls you can observe natural formations and paintings, hand painted with representations of the technique of negative human faces painted on the walls, sculptural representations, representations of animals and some geometric shapes. Tools were also recovered.

The prehispanic Maya also used the cave as shelter and used to extract the clay to make their tools.
The tour offers visits to the galleries and natural formations known locally as the room of musical columns, a vault known as the cathedral, jaltunes, Grand Canyon, corn cob, the infant, black hand paintings, the room of stalactites and trenches.
The Huechil cavity was excavated where they found remains of extinct fauna such as mammoth bones and vegetation different from today.
The occupation in Loltún goes back more than 10,000 years and served as a hiding place during the caste war.

Location 
It is located 110 kilometers southwest of Mérida. It is 7 km south of the town of Oxkutzcab.

See also
Maya cave sites

References

External links

 Loltun Cave Photo Archive
 INAH official site
 Caves of the Yucatan
 Photo Essay of the Loltun Cave

Caves of Mexico
Cave sites in Mesoamerican archaeology
Maya sites in Yucatán
Landforms of Yucatán